Ro-3 may refer to:

 , an Imperial Japanese Navy submarine in commissioned in 1922 and stricken in 1932
 Type F submarine, an Imperial Japanese Navy submarine class whose F2 subclass sometimes is called the Ro-3 class